Chanel Terrero Martínez (born 28 July 1991), known simply as Chanel, is a Spanish-Cuban singer, dancer and actress, having worked in several stage musicals. She represented Spain at the Eurovision Song Contest 2022, after having won Benidorm Fest 2022 with her debut single "SloMo". She finished in third place with 459 points, the best placing for Spain since the 1995 contest.

Early life 
Chanel was born in Havana, Cuba, and moved to Olesa de Montserrat in Catalonia, Spain, at the age of three. Part of her family is of Spanish origin.

She has taken singing, acting and ballet classes from a young age. She learned from choreographers such as Víctor Ullate, Coco Comín and Glòria Gella. At the age of sixteen she started her career in musical theatre.

Career

Chanel moved to Madrid to start her acting career. During the 2010s she participated in stage musicals such as  Mamma Mia!, Flashdance, El guardaespaldas and El rey león.

Her acting career includes various roles on television and cinema, both nationally and internationally.

As a dancer, she has worked with different artists. In 2010, she was part of Shakira's dancing crew for a performance at the MTV Europe Music Awards.

She also was part of the dancing crew in the Spanish show Tu cara me suena on Antena 3.

Chanel took part in the castings for the Spanish stage production of West Side Story. She was one of the three finalists for the role of Anita. She also was one of the five finalists worldwide for the same role in Steven Spielberg's film version of the musical, West Side Story.

She took part in Benidorm Fest in 2022 with her debut single "SloMo". Her performance was choreographed by Kyle Hanagami, who has also worked with Jennifer Lopez, Britney Spears and Blackpink, among other artists. She won the first semi-final on 26 January 2022, and also the final on 29 January, becoming the Spanish entrant for the Eurovision Song Contest 2022 in Turin, Italy. The song entered the Spanish Singles Chart at number thirteen. In the Eurovision final, the song placed third, Spain's best result since 1995. Following the contest, the song went on to top the Spanish Singles Chart and obtained a double platinum certification by Promusicae.

On 10 June 2022, she participated in the Carnival of Santa Cruz de Tenerife.

Her second single, titled "TOKE", was released on 25 October 2022 as the official song of the Spain national football team for the 2022 FIFA World Cup.

In 4 February 2023, Chanel was announced as a judge for the RTVE singing competition series Cover Night.

Theatre work 
She has taken part in several musical productions, becoming a regular name in this genre in Spain.

 Malinche (2021–2022; main character)
 Fiebre Hamilton (musical homage to Lin-Manuel Miranda in Madrid). 
 El guardaespaldas (main character).
 Flashdance (actress/singer in Barcelona and tour).
 Nine (main actress/singer)
 El rey león (Teatro Lope de Vega Madrid)
 Mamma Mia! (actress, singer and dancer)
 Lío Ibiza (cabaret: actress, singer and dancer)
 El gran libro mágico (children's musical, main actress/singer)
 Show “Starlite Marbella” (lead singer)
 Delizia (cabaret: actress, singer and dancer)
 La ratita presumida, centro estético (children's musical, lead role)
 El lobo y las 7 cabritas (children's musical, lead role)
 Tarzán (children's musical, singer and dancer)
 Mortadelo y Filemón (dancer and actress)

Filmography

Film

Television

Fiction

Music shows

Music videos 
 "Gigantes" by Ruth Lorenzo, as dancer. 2014.
 "Another Day of Sun - La La Land (Spanish version)", by Fran Coem. 2017.
 "México Mágico" (as part of the original cast of Malinche El Musical by Nacho Cano). 2021.

Discography

Singles

As lead artist 

Notes:

Promotional singles

Other appearances

Awards and nominations
 As an actress, she has been nominated as part of the cast of the short film La llorona by Ismael Olivares.

References

External links 
 
 
 
 
 

Living people
1991 births
Actresses from Havana
Musicians from Havana
People from Baix Llobregat
Spanish female dancers
Spanish musical theatre actresses
Spanish television actresses
Spanish film actresses
Cuban emigrants to Spain
Cuban female dancers
Cuban stage actresses
Cuban television actresses
Cuban film actresses
Benidorm Fest winners
Spanish LGBT singers
Bisexual singers
Spanish bisexual people
Bisexual women
Eurovision Song Contest entrants for Spain
Eurovision Song Contest entrants of 2022
21st-century Spanish women singers
21st-century Spanish singers
21st-century Cuban women singers
Spanish people of Cuban descent
Spanish people of Catalan descent
Cuban people of Catalan descent